Liberté is a 2019 drama film written and directed by Albert Serra. Set in the 18th century, it tells the story of the libertines that spend a night of sexual debauchery in the forest. The film had its world premiere in the Un Certain Regard section at the 2019 Cannes Film Festival on 18 May 2019.

Plot
In the 18th century, the libertines spend a night of sexual debauchery in the forest.

Cast

Production
The film was preceded by an installation at the Reina Sofia Museum in Madrid and a theater play. For the film, Albert Serra got inspiration from the French painters such as Alexandre-Évariste Fragonard and François Boucher. The cast consists of a mix of professional and non-professional actors.

Initially the scene in which the men pour milk and semen on the totally naked body of Mademoiselle de Jensling, played by Iliana Zabeth, was supposed to be a little different. "In my main scene, for example, I was supposed to be tied up, but not suspended, this was decided later. Then I did a lot of research on shibari. Then other elements were added to the shooting, such as milk. We explored a lot on set," said Zabeth.

Talking about the 'golden shower' scene, director Albert Serra revealed that the guy being urinated on by Theodora Marcadé (playing Madame de Dumeval) and by off-screen participants, wasn't a professional actor. "It's played by the guy who does the post-production of all my films, he came on set especially for that, it's the only time I made a request," Serra said.

The cast consists of a mix of professional and non-professional actors and includes two of the film's technicians. One of them is Laura Poulvet, who is the set decorator but also plays Mademoiselle de Geldöbel's character.

Release
The film had its world premiere in the Un Certain Regard section at the 2019 Cannes Film Festival on 18 May 2019. It was also screened at the Toronto International Film Festival, the New York Film Festival, and the International Film Festival Rotterdam. It was released in France on 4 September 2019.

Reception

Critical reception
The website's critical consensus reads, "It may prove more tedious than titillating for some, but Liberté boldly blurs the line between filmgoer and voyeur." On Metacritic, the film has a weighted average score of 50 out of 100, based on 8 critics, indicating "mixed or average reviews".

Carson Lund of Slant Magazine gave the film 3 out of 4 stars, writing, "Serra's overriding impulse in Liberté is to bask in the atmospheric peculiarities of his fantasized scenario, a drive that places the film in closer proximity to an immersive museum exhibition than to narrative cinema." Leslie Felperin of The Hollywood Reporter commented that "even as pornography, it's not much of a source of joy, and the dialogue is even more risible than some of the worst efforts out of the San Fernando Valley."

Accolades

References

External links
 

2019 films
2019 drama films
2010s French-language films
2010s German-language films
French drama films
German drama films
Portuguese drama films
Spanish drama films
2010s Italian-language films
Films directed by Albert Serra
2010s French films
2010s German films